The Minister for Public Health, Women's Health and Sport is a Junior ministerial post in the Scottish Government. The post was first created as Minister for Public Health in May 2007 after the appointment of the Scottish National Party minority administration. It was renamed in February 2009, with further renamings in 2011, 2016 and 2018.

The Minister reports to the Cabinet Secretary for Health and Sport, who has overall responsibility for the portfolio, and is a member of cabinet. The current Minister for Public Health, Sport and Wellbeing is Mairi Gougeon MSP.

Overview 
The Minister has specific responsibility for:

COVID-19 testing programme
Health improvement
Public health and healthy working lives
Physical activity, sport, sporting events and events legacy
Problem alcohol use and recovery
Care Inspectorate
Carers
Child and maternal health (excluding mental health)
Health protection
Person-centred care
Self-directed support
Sexual health

List of office holders

History
From 1999 to 2007, public health was the responsibility of the Minister for Health and Community Care and the Deputy Minister for Health and Community Care.  The Salmond government, elected following the 2007 elections, created the junior post of Minister for Public Health who assisted the Cabinet Secretary for Health and Wellbeing in the Scottish Government.

In 2009, the post became the Minister for Public Health and Sport after assuming the Sport portfolio.  From 2011, the post reverted to the title of Minister for Public Health and sport was once again separated off to a new Minister for Commonwealth Games and Sport post. Following the 2016 Scottish Parliament election, Nicola Sturgeon recreated the old Minister for Public Health and Sport post.

The Minister does not attend the Scottish Cabinet.

See also
Scottish Government
Scottish Parliament
Question Time

References

External links 
Minister for Public Health and Sport on Scottish Government website

Public Health
Health in Scotland
2007 establishments in Scotland
Public health in the United Kingdom
Health ministers of Scotland